Henry William Bunbury (1 July 1750 – 7 May 1811) was an English caricaturist. The second son of Sir William Bunbury, 5th Baronet (see Bunbury baronets), of Mildenhall, Suffolk, he came of an old Norman family.  He was educated at Westminster School and St Catharine's College, Cambridge, and soon showed a talent for drawing, especially for humorous subjects. He temporarily left Cambridge to embark on a tour of Europe, during which time he may have studied in Rome; he returned to school in 1771 but is not known to have completed a degree. His European travels inspired a series of caricatures mocking foreigners, notably his La Cuisine de la Poste, exhibited at the Royal Academy in 1770.

His more serious efforts were no great success, but his caricatures are as famous as those of his contemporaries Thomas Rowlandson and James Gillray, good examples being his A Long Story (1782), Country Club (1788), and Barber's Shop (1803). He was a popular character, and the friend of most of the notabilities of his day, whom he never offended by attempting political satire; his easy circumstances and social position (he was colonel of the West Suffolk Militia, and was appointed equerry to the Duke of York and Albany in 1787) allowed him the leisure to practise his talents.

The Oxford Dictionary of National Biography describes his A Long Minuet as Danced at Bath as the most successful of his lifetime, using an "innovative story-telling" format that is considered a forerunner to the comic strip. His caricatures were regularly reissued, even as he turned his attention to other subjects: he finished half of a commissioned set of 48 drawings of Shakespearean works before abandoning the series in 1796, and after the death of his wife and eldest son he took up oil painting.

In August 1771 he married Catherine, eldest daughter of Kane William Horneck (an officer in the Royal Engineers) and his wife Hannah Muggles. Bunbury and Catherine's second son Henry Bunbury succeeded to the baronetcy.

Gallery

References

Sources

External links

National Portrait Gallery: Henry William Bunbury
Original Antique Prints and Engravings by ... Henry William Bunbury
Bunbury prints within the collection of St. Edmundsbury Heritage Service
Billy Ireland Cartoon Library & Museum Art Database

British illustrators
English caricaturists
English illustrators
Alumni of St Catharine's College, Cambridge
Henry
People educated at Westminster School, London
1750 births
1811 deaths